Park Won-jong or Bak Wonjong (Hangul: 박원종, Hanja: 朴元宗; 1467 – 1510) was a Korean politician and soldier during the Joseon Dynasty, who served as Chief State Councillor from 1506 to 1510. He was a major leader of the Jungjong coup who had brought King Jungjong to the throne. His courtesy name was Baekyun (백윤, 伯胤). He was the uncle of Yun Im and Queen Janggyeong, the wife of King Jungjong of Joseon. He was the foster father of Royal Noble Consort Gyeong of Miryang Park clan (경빈 박씨), a concubine of King Jungjong.

Family 
 Grandfather
 Park Geo-so (박거소, 朴去疎)
 Grandmother
 Lady Sim of the Cheongsong Sim clan (청송 심씨, 靑松 沈氏)
 Father
 Park Jung-seon (박중선, 朴仲善) (1435 – 1481)
 Uncle: Park Suk-seon (박숙선, 朴叔善)
 Mother
 Lady Heo of the Yangcheon Heo clan (양천 허씨)
 Siblings
 Older sister: Grand Internal Princess Consort Seungpyeong of the Suncheon Park clan (승평부대부인 박씨, 昇平府大夫人 朴氏) (1455 – 20 July 1506)
 Brother-in-law: Grand Prince Wolsan (월산대군, 月山大君) (5 January 1454 – 22 January 1488)
 Half-nephew: Yi Yi, Prince Deokpung (덕풍군 이이, 德豊君 李恞) (20 August 1485 – 26 March 1506)
 Niece-in-law: Lady Yun of the Papyeong Yun clan (파평 윤씨, 坡平 尹氏) (1485 – 16 January 1536)
 Older sister: Lady Park of the Suncheon Park clan (순천 박씨, 順天 朴氏)
 Brother-in-law: Shin Mu-jeong (신무정, 辛武鼎)
 Older sister: Lady Park of the Suncheon Park clan (순천 박씨, 順天 朴氏)
 Brother-in-law – Yi Tak (이탁, 李鐸)
 Older sister: Lady Park of the Suncheon Park clan (순천 박씨, 順天 朴氏)
 Brother-in-law: Han Ik (한익, 韓翊) (1460 – 1488)
 Nephew: Han Se-chang (한세창, 韓世昌)
 Nephew: Han Suk-chang (한숙창, 韓叔昌) (1478 – 1537)
 Older sister: Lady Park of the Suncheon Park clan (순천 박씨, 順天 朴氏)
 Brother-in-law: Kim Jun (김준, 金俊)
 Younger sister - Lady Park of the Suncheon Park clan (순천 박씨, 順天 朴氏) (? - 1498)
 Brother-in-law: Yun Yeo-pil (1466 – 1555) (윤여필, 尹汝弼)
 Niece: Lady Yun of the Papyeong Yun clan (파평 윤씨, 坡平 尹氏) (1485 – 16 January 1536)
 Niece: Princess Consort Papyeong of the Papyeong Yun clan (파평군부인 윤씨, 坡平郡夫人 尹氏)
 Nephew: Yun Im (윤임, 尹任) (1487 – 30 August 1545)
 Niece: Yun Cheon-deok (윤천덕, 尹千德), Lady Yun of the Papyeong Yun clan (1488 – ?)
 Niece: Yun Myeong-hye, Queen Janggyeong of the Papyeong Yun clan (장경왕후 윤씨) (10 August 1491 – 16 March 1515)
 Niece: Lady Yun of the Papyeong Yun clan (윤씨, 尹氏) (1498 - ?)
 Half-niece: Yun Ok-chun (윤옥춘, 尹玉春), Lady Yun of the Papyeong Yun clan (1518 – ?)
 Younger sister: Princess Consort Seungpyeong of the Suncheon Park clan (승평부부인 순천 박씨, 昇平府夫人 順天朴氏)
 Brother-in-law: Grand Prince Jean (제안대군, 齊安大君) (13 February 1466 – 14 December 1525)
 Adoptive nephew: Yi Pa (이파, 李葩) (13 January 1515 – 15 September 1571)
 Wives and their respective issue(s) 
 Lady Yun of the Papyeong Yun clan (파평 윤씨); daughter of Yun In (윤인)
 Adoptive daughter: Royal Noble Consort Gyeong of the Miryang Park clan (경빈 박씨, 敬嬪 朴氏) (1492 – 1533); daughter of Park Su-rim (박수림, 朴秀林)
 Adoptive son-in-law: Jungjong of Joseon (조선 중종) (16 April 1488 - 29 November 1544)
 Adoptive Grandson: Yi Mi, Prince Bokseong (이미 복성군) (28 September 1509 – 18 June 1533)
 Adoptive Granddaughter: Yi Cheol-hwan, Princess Hyesun (혜순옹주) (12 February 1512 – 16 January 1583)
 Adoptive Granddaughter: Yi Seok-hwan, Princess Hyejeong (혜정공주) (27 October 1514 – 4 May 1580)
 Unnamed concubine 
 Son: Park Un (박운, 朴雲)

Popular culture

Drama 
 Portrayed by Jo Gyeong-hwan in the 1985 MBC TV series 500 Years of Joseon: The Wind Orchid.
 Portrayed by Lee Dong-jun in the 1995 MBC TV series Jang Noksu.
 Portrayed by Kim Byeong-gi in the 1996 KBS TV series Jo Gwang-jo.
 Portrayed by Cha Gwang-su in the 1998–2000 KBS TV series The King and Queen.
 Portrayed by Kim Yeong-in in the 2001–2002 SBS TV series Ladies of the Palace.
 Portrayed by Lee Chang-hwan in the 2003–2004 MBC TV series Dae Jang Geum.
 Portrayed by Cha Ki-hwan in the 2007–2008 SBS TV series The King and I.
 Portrayed by Park Su-il in the 2011–2012 JTBC TV series Insu, The Queen Mother.
 Portrayed by Choi Dae-chul in the 2017 MBC TV series The Rebel. 
 Portrayed by Park Won-sang in the 2017 KBS2 TV series Queen for Seven Days.

Film 
 Portrayed by Kim Jin-gyu in the 1962 film Tryant Yeonsan.
 Portrayed by Jo Han-chul in the 2015 film The Treacherous.

See also 
 Jungjong coup
 Seong Hui-an
 Yu Sun-jeong

Site web 
 Bak Wonjong

References 

Korean military personnel
Korean politicians
16th-century Korean people
Korean generals
1467 births
1510 deaths